Aaron Fox may refer to:

 Aaron Fox (musicologist), American ethnomusicologist, anthropologist, and linguist
 Aaron Fox (ice hockey) (born 1976), American ice hockey executive and player

See also
De'Aaron Fox, American basketball player